The Coppermine River is a river in the North Slave and Kitikmeot regions of the Northwest Territories and Nunavut in Canada. It rises in Lac de Gras, a small lake near Great Slave Lake, and flows generally north to Coronation Gulf, an arm of the Arctic Ocean. The river freezes in winter but may still flow under the ice.

The community of Kugluktuk (formerly Coppermine) is located at the river's mouth.

The river was named for the copper ores which are located along the river, by Samuel Hearne in 1771. Hearne found only one lump of copper and commercial mining was not considered viable.

It is the site of the Bloody Falls Massacre, when Matonabbee, Samuel Hearne's guide, and his fellow Chipewyan warriors ambushed and massacred the local Inuit.

Gallery

See also
List of longest rivers of Canada

References

Further reading

 Dredge, L. A. Where the river meets the sea geology and landforms of the lower Coppermine River Valley and Kugluktuk, Nunavut. [Ottawa]: Geological Survey of Canada, 2001. 

 Steele, Peter. The Man Who Mapped The Arctic: The Intrepid Life of George Back, Franklin's Lieutenant, 2003.

External links

Rivers of the Northwest Territories
Rivers of Kitikmeot Region
Volcanism of the Northwest Territories